Arulmigu Solaimalai Murugan Temple is a Hindu temple, located about 25 kilometres north of Madurai, Tamilnadu, India atop a hill covered with dense forests. One of the six important abodes (Arupadaiveedu) of Lord Muruga of Madurai District Entrance of the temple come under Madurai And Entire Prahara Belong to Madurai District of Tamilnadu, it is close to the Vishnu temple of Azhagar Kovil.

The temple is maintained and administered by the Hindu Religious and Charitable Endowments Department of the Government of Tamil Nadu.

Location 

Pazhamudircholai is a fertile hill, blessed with nature's bounty in the form of innumerable fruits, vegetables and natural springs. It is a dense forest where Valli is supposed to have lived. The temple itself is relatively small with Valli, Deivayanai, and Lord Muruga in a separate shrine. Lord Ganesha is also present in a separate shrine. There is a Temple Tower and monkeys play around the area. There is another small temple above Pazhamudhir Cholai called Rakkayi Kovil where local tribes lead their lives. This Rakkayi Kovil has a well which is supposed to be the origin of the Silambaru river which flows down the hill. 

Although there are hundreds of Temples in Tamil Nadu for Lord Muruga, six particular temples called Arupadaiveedu are very famous among them. Important events in Lord Muruga's history happened in these places.

Among the Arupadaiveedu, Pazhamudircholai is the last. Lord Muruga at Pazhamudircholai is praised in several works of old Tamil literature such as the Silappathikaram, the Ettuthokai and the Pattupattu.

One can reach Pazhamudircholai by car, van, two-wheeler or bus. From Madurai one can catch the bus on route number 44 to reach it. There is a bus shuttle every 20 minutes from the foot of the hill to the Temple. It takes approximately 15 minutes (3.4 km) to reach the temple.

Gallery

References

Hindu temples in Madurai district
Hindu temples in Madurai
Murugan temples in Tamil Nadu
Tourist attractions in Madurai
Buildings and structures in Madurai
Religious buildings and structures in Madurai
Kaumaram